The 2017 Junior League World Series took place from August 13–20 in Taylor, Michigan, United States. Taoyuan, Taiwan defeated Kennett Square, Pennsylvania in the championship game. It was Taiwan's fifth straight championship.

Teams

Results

United States Bracket

International Bracket

Elimination Round

References

Junior League World Series
Junior League World Series
Junior